Thompson Township is one of the eighteen townships of Delaware County, Ohio, United States. As of the 2010 census the population was 684, up from 558 at the 2000 census.

Geography
Located in the northwestern corner of the county, it borders the following townships:
Prospect Township, Marion County - north
Radnor Township - east
Scioto Township - south
Leesburg Township, Union County - southwest
Claibourne Township, Union County - northwest

No municipalities are located in Thompson Township.

Name and history
Thompson Township was founded in 1820. Thompson is the name of an early government surveyor.

Statewide, other Thompson Townships are located in Geauga and Seneca counties.

Government
The township is governed by a three-member board of trustees, who are elected in November of odd-numbered years to a four-year term beginning on the following January 1. Two are elected in the year after the presidential election and one is elected in the year before it. There is also an elected township fiscal officer, who serves a four-year term beginning on April 1 of the year after the election, which is held in November of the year before the presidential election. Vacancies in the fiscal officership or on the board of trustees are filled by the remaining trustees.

References

External links
County website

Townships in Delaware County, Ohio
Townships in Ohio